The history of FC Basel spans the period from 1893 to the present day. Due to the size, it has been divided into five sections. This page chronicles the history of FCB in detail for the years from World War II in 1939 to 1965. For detail on the other individual periods of the club's history, see the following articles:

 History of FC Basel (1893–1918)
 History of FC Basel (1918–1939)
 History of FC Basel (1965–2000)
 History of FC Basel (2000–present)

Promotion, relegation, promotion

Forty-seventh, no promotion due to World War II

Albert Besse was the club's new chairman. He took over from Emil Junker at the AGM on 15 July 1939. Player-manager Fernand Jaccard had left the club after the relegation season to join FC Locarno. The former players Walter Dietrich and Max Galler took over as team co-managers.

After being relegated last season for the first time in the club's history, Basel played this season in the newly reorganized 1. Liga. Due to the outbreak of World War II on 1 September 1939 the start of the Swiss football championship was postponed until 22 October and the 1. Liga postponed until December. The 1939–40 Nationalliga was played as "Championnat Suisse de Mobilisation" due to the war and the 1. Liga divided into five regional zones. There was to be no promotion and no relegation. Basel were allocated to 1. Liga group 3 (North-West Switzerland) together with Solothurn, Aarau, Concordia Basel and FC Birsfelden. The group was played in three round-robins.

Basel played a good season, in total including test matches they played 29 games, winning 22, drawing three and suffering four defeats. In total they scored 98 goals conceding 50. After winning their four test games in October, Basel started the season well in December winning the first seven matches straight off before suffering their first defeat at the beginning of April. At the end of the group stage Basel had won nine games drawn two and were defeated just once and with 20 points were five points above second placed Aarau. Basel advanced to the play-off stage. In the semi-final they won the round-robin against group four winners SC Brühl St. Gallen and group five winners AC Bellinzona. Basel became 1. Liga champions winning the best of three final against Fribourg.

In the Swiss Cup Basel started with a victory in the 2nd principal round away against lower tier SC Zofingen. In the next round they were again drawn away from home against lower tier SC Schöftland. This was won 4–1. In the next round Basel played in the Landhof against Aarau but were defeated and knocked out of the competition.

Forty-eighth, missed promotion

Albert Besse was the club's chairman for the second consecutive season. Former Swiss international Eugen Rupf was appointed as manager. Basel played 27 matches in this season. 14 of these matches were in the 1. Liga, two in the play-offs, four in the Swiss Cup and seven were friendly matches. Of these friendlies three were played at home in the Landhof, four were away games. Five friendly games were won and two ended in a defeat.

Despite having been 1. Liga champions the previous season, Basel played this season in the 1. Liga as well because there had been no promotion to the top tier of Swiss football due to World War II. This season, however, two promotions were planned. 24 teams competed in the 1.Liga, which was divided into three regional groups. Basel were allocated to the Central Group, together with local rivals Concordia Basel and FC Birsfelden. The further teams in this group were Aarau, FC Bern, US Bienne-Boujean and Fribourg. Basel and Aarau dominated their group, both teams winning 11 of their 14 group games. Basel suffered one sole defeat, and that against Aarau, but won the group with 24 points, one point above them, because they had been defeated twice. But in the promotion play-offs Basel were defeated by Cantonal Neuchatel and drew the game with Zürich. Their two play-off opponents were thus promoted and Basel remained for another season in the 1 Liga.

Basel joined the Swiss Cup in the 2nd principal round and were drawn at home to and beat Old Boys 4–3. In round three Basel beat lower tier FC Allschwil and were drawn against higher tier Nordstern Basel in round four. After a 3–3 draw, Basel were knocked out when they lost the replay.

Forty-ninth, promotion and cup final

Albert Besse was the club's chairman for the third consecutive season. This was the club's third season in the 1st League (second flight of Swiss football) after being relegated from the Nationalliga in the 1938–39 season. Eugen Rupf was player-coach for his second season. Basel played 38 games in their 1941–42 season. 22 in the league group, two in the play-offs, 10 in the cup and 4 were test games. They won 27 and drew eight, they were defeated only three times. In total they scored 114 goals and conceded just 33.

There were twenty four teams contesting in the 1st League in the 1941–42 season, twelve in group East and twelve in group West. The winner of each group were to play a play-off for promotion to the Nationalliga the following year. Basel were allocated to group East together with the two other local teams Concordia Basel and FC Birsfelden. Basel started the league season well. On 31 August 1941 in the first league game against SC Juventus Zürich their striker Alex Mathys scored seven goals as Basel won by 10–1. In the game on 18 January 1942 against Schaffhausen Basel won 11–0 and Erhard Grieder scored five goals. Basel finished their season as winners of group East. Basel managed 18 victories and 3 draws from their 22 games, just one defeat. With a total of 39 points, scoring 77 and conceding just 15 goals Basel were five points clear of second placed Blue Stars Zürich. The promotion play-offs were then against group West winners FC Bern. The 1st leg was the away tie, this ended with a goalless draw. Basel won the 2nd leg at home at the Landhof 3–1 to achieve Promotion.

In the Swiss Cup Basel started in the 2nd principal round and were drawn at home against local rivals Old Boys. Basel won 4–2 after extra time. In round 3 they were drawn at home and won 1–0 against another local team FC Birsfelden. The fourth round was another home tie and they beat the higher tier Nationalliga team BSC Young Boys by three goals to nil. The next round gave Basel another home tie against 1st League team Solothurn and they completed an easy victory, winning 6–1. The quarter-final draw saw them playing at home again, this time against Nationlige team Lugano. The game ended 1–1 after extra time. The two clubs could not agree on a date for the replay, therefore the winners were to be decided by lottery decision. Basel qualified on toss of a coin. The semi-final gave Basel their sixth home match and their third Nationalliga club FC Grenchen. On March 29 at Stadion Rankhof the semi-final between Basel and Grenchen ended with a goalless draw after extra time. A replay, on 4 April, was required. In the Gurzelen Stadion in Biel/Bienne the replay ended with a victory. Hermann Suter scored both Basel goals as they won 2–0. Basel thus qualified for the final which was just two days later on 6 April in the Wankdorf Stadion in Bern against the Nationalliga team Grasshopper Club. The final ended goalless after extra time and a replay was required here as well. The replay did not take place until the end of May because the Nationalliga championship had ended with a heat and thus a play-off was required here too between the Grasshoppers and Grenchen. The cup final replay was on 25 May, again in the Wankdorf Stadion, against the then Nationalliga champions Grasshoppers. Basel led by half time through two goals by Fritz Schmidlin, but two goals from Grubenmann a third from Neukom gave the Grasshoppers a 3–2 victory. Thus the Grasshoppers won the double.

Fiftieth anniversary

Albert Besse was the club's chairman for the fourth consecutive season. Eugen Rupf was the team's player-coach during this season and it was his third season as first team manager. Basel played 33 games in their 1942–43 season. 26 in the Nationalliga, three in the cup and four were test games. They won 12, drew five and lost 16 times. In total including the test games and the cup competition they scored 59 goals and conceded 67. Of the four test games three were won and one was drawn.

There were 14 teams contesting in the 1942–43 Nationalliga. The team that finished in last position in the league table would be relegated. Rupf and his team had won promotion the previous season and thus it was clear that this was going to be a difficult year. Things started badly and five of the first six games ended with a defeat. Shortly before Christmas, Basel suffered their biggest defeat of the season, a 1–9 dubbing by Servette. However, despite this defeat, with the following 3–0 away game victory against their direct opponents Luzern, who also playing at risk of relegation near the bottom of the table, and a 2–0 home game victory against their other direct opponents Nordstern, Basel ended the season with 18 points in 13th position, just two points above local rivals Nordstern, who ended the season on the relegation spot. Of their 26 league games Basel won seven, drew four and lost 15 times. They scored 29 league goals and conceded 57. Hermann Suter was the team's top league goal scorer with six goals. Erich Andres and Rodolfo Kappenberger were joint second best scorers, each with five goals.

In the Swiss Cup Basel started in the 4th principal round with a home tie at the Landhof against lower tier local side FC Pratteln. This ended with an expected easy 6–0 victory. In the round of 16 Basel were also allocated with a home match against lower tier SV Schaffhausen. Hermann Suter and Fritz Schmidlin were both able to achieve a hat-trick and Basel won 9–2. Then in the quarter-finals Basel were drawn at home against top tier Lugano. However, a 0–2 defeat ended their presence in this season's cup competition.

Fifty-first season

Team manager Eugen Rupf left the club following the last season and Willy Wolf was appointed as Basel's new team manager. Basel played 41 games in their 1943–44 season. 26 in the Nationalliga, five in the cup and ten were test games. They won 18, drew 11 and lost 12 times. In total, including the test games and the cup competition, they scored 83 goals and conceded 65.

There were 14 teams contesting in the 1943–44 Nationalliga. The team that finished in last position in the league table would be relegated. Basel played a mediocre season, winning nine matches, drawing eight and suffered nine defeats they ended the season with 26 points in 9th position. Lausanne-Sport won the Swiss championship, Luzern were relegated. Alfred Weisshaar was Basel's top league goal scorer with 15 goals, joint second league scorer with Alfred Bickel (Grasshopper Club) behind top scorer Erich Andres (Young Fellows Zürich) who netted 23 times.

In the Swiss Cup Basel started in the round of 32 with a home tie at the Landhof against lower tier local side Nordstern Basel. This was won 4–1. In the round of 16 they had a home tie and won 6–2 against St. Gallen. The quarter-final gave Basel another home tie and they won 5–1 against Young Boys. The semi-final was an away tie against Biel-Bienne. Hans Vonthron's goal was the only goal of the game and Basel qualified for the final. This was played on 10 April in Wankdorf Stadium in Bern against Lausanne-Sport. Two goals from Numa Monnard and one from Roger Courtois during the last five minutes of the match meant that Basel lost the game 0–3 and Lausanne won the national double.

Fifty-second, relegation

Emil Junker was the club's new chairman. He took over from Albert Besse following the AGM on 8 July 1944. Max Barras was appointed as new first team manager. Basel played 43 games in their 1944–45 season. 28 in the Nationalliga (including two replayed games), three in the Swiss Cup and 12 were test games. They won 14, drew 10 and lost 19 times. In total, including the test games and the cup competition, they scored 86 goals and conceded 82.

There were 14 teams contesting in the 1944–45 Nationalliga A. The two teams that finished in last and second last position in the league table would be relegated. Basel played a bad season, winning just six matches, drawing six and they suffered 14 defeats, thus they ended the season with 18 points in 13th position, second last. Two of the games during the season were played under protest and were later replayed. These were the games on 24 September 1944 against Lugano and on 29 April 1945 against Grenchen. The protest was because Basel could not field their best teams due to the military duties of their players. Both replayed games ended with a defeat. Grasshopper Club won the Swiss championship, Basel and St. Gallen were relegated. After just three seasons in the top flight of Swiss football, Basel suffered relegation again.

In the Swiss Cup Basel started in the 3rd principal round with an away tie against lower tier local side FC Allschwil and a 6–0 victory. In the round of 32 Basel had a home game at the Landhof against lower tier SC Zofingen which ended with a 3–1 win. In the round of 16 Basel travelled to an away game against St. Gallen and were knocked out of the competition.

Fifty-third, promotion

Emil Junker was the club's chairman. It was his second year as president of the club. Max Barras was first team manager for the second season. Basel played a total of 42 games in their 1945–46 season. Of these 26 in the Nationalliga B, three in the Swiss Cup and 13 were test games. The test games resulted with seven victories, one draw and five defeats. In total, they won 28 games, drew six and lost eight times. In total, including the test games and the cup competition, they scored 141 goals and conceded 55.

Basel had suffered relegation the previous season and their clear aim was to obtain immediate promotion. The Nationalliga B was contested by 14 teams. The two teams that finished at the top of the division were to be promoted. Basel played a good season, winning 19 league matches, drawing five, losing only two matches. Thus they ended the season with 43 points in 1st position four points ahead of Urania Genève Sport in 2nd position and these two clubs won promotion.

In the Swiss Cup Basel started in the 3rd principal round with an away tie against lower tier local side SC Schöftland this ended with a 5–1 victory. In the round of 32 Basel had an away game against Nationalliga B team Fribourg which ended with a 4–0 win. In the round of 16 Basel had a home game at the Landhof against higher tier Servette and were knocked out of the competition.

Jules Düblin, chairman 1946–1959

Fifty-fourth, second cup title

Jules Düblin was the club's new chairman and took over this position from Emil Junkerat the club's AGM. Düblin had been player for FC Basel in the years 1919–1926 and had been on the club's board of directors. He was doctor, banker and politician, became author and private art collector. He presided the club during the period July 1946 until Mai 1959. Thus in the club's history he is the most permanent president that the club has had to date. As President of the club he joined the Swiss Football League (SFL) and was appointed honorary Member in 1965.

After his playing career the Austrian ex-international Anton Schall, who suffered from a rare heart condition, moved to Switzerland and took over Basel as club trainer for the 1946–47 season. Basel played a total of 39 games in this season. Of these 26 in the Nationalliga A, six in the Swiss Cup and seven were test games. The test games resulted with three victories, three draws and one defeat. In total, they won 21 games, drew eight and lost 10 times. In total, including the test games and the cup competition, they scored 111 goals and conceded 65.

There were fourteen teams contesting in the 1946–47 Nationalliga A. Basel finished their season in fourth position in the table, with twelve victories from 26 games, scoring in total 60 goals. In the Swiss Cup Basel started in round 3 with a home match against local team Black Stars Basel, the game was won 3– 2. In round 4 they had an away tie against La Chaux-de-Fonds which was won 2–1. Round 5 gave Basel another home tie in the Landhof against another local club Nordstern and this ended with a 6–1 victory. Thus they advanced to the quarter-finals and were matched against the Grasshoppers. The Grasshoppers were beaten 2–1. In the semi-final goals from top scorers Traugott Oberer and René Bader gave Basel a 2–1 victory against Grenchen. Therefore, Basel advanced to the Cup-Final, which was played in the Stadion Neufeld in Bern on 7 April 1947. Basel won the final 3–0 against Lausanne Sport and thus their second cup title. In the Final Paul Stöcklin scored two goals and Bader the other. Schall led Basel to win the Cup, but he died shortly afterwards at the age of 40 years during a workout on the football field. Following this unhappy event captain Ernst Hufschmid later took over as team coach.

Fifty-fifth, Anton Schall

Düblin was the club's chairman for the second successive season. Anton Schall was to continue as first team manager, but he died at the age of 40 years, during a workout on the football field, shortly after the pre-season training had begun. Following this unhappy event captain Ernst Hufschmid then took over as player-manager. Basel played a total of 46 games in this season. Of these 26 in the Nationalliga A, four in the Swiss Cup and 16 were test games. The test games resulted with eight victories, three draws and five defeats. In total, they won 18 games, drew 13 and lost 15 times. In total, including the test games and the cup competition, they scored 100 goals and conceded 93.

There were fourteen teams contesting in the 1947–48 Nationalliga A, the bottom two teams in the table to be relagted. Suffering under the shock of team manager Schall's death, the team started the season badly, losing six of their first eleven games without a single victory. With seven victories in the second half of the season the team were able to lift themselves out of the relegation zone. Basel finished the season in 10th position in the table, with seven victories from 26 games, ten draws and they lost nine times. The team scored 44 goals in the domestic league. Bellinzona won the championship.

In the Swiss Cup Basel started in round 3 with a home match against SC Balerna, the game was won 7–0. In round 4 Basel were drawn with a home tie against Zürich which was won 2–1. Round 5 gave Basel another home tie in the Landhof against Locarno and this ended with a 5–3 victory. Thus Basel advanced to the quarter-finals, where they were drawn away against La Chaux-de-Fonds. The hosts won the game by two goals to nil and continued to the semi-final and the final. The final was played on 29 March at Wankdorf Stadium in Bern against Grenchen and ended with a 2–2 draw. The replay three weeks later was also drawn 2–2 and so a second replay was required. This was played on 27 June in the Stade Olympique de la Pontaise in Lausanne. La Chaux-de-Fonds won the trophy, winning the game by four goals to nil.

Fifty-sixth season

Düblin was the club's chairman for the third successive season. Ernst Hufschmid who had functioned as player-coach the previous season continued in the function as player-manager this season as well. Basel played a total of 36 games in this season. Of these 26 in the Nationalliga A, four in the Swiss Cup and six were test games. The test games resulted with two victories, three draws and one defeat. In total, including the test games and the cup competition, they won 17 games, drew 11 and lost eight times. In the 36 games they scored 75 goals and conceded 49. There were fourteen teams contesting in the 1948–49 Nationalliga A, the bottom two teams in the table to be relelgated. Basel started the season badly, losing three of the first four away games. Things changed in Autumn and they lost only one of the following eleven matches and they climbed to the upper end of the table. At the end of the season Basel had risen to second position, but were seven points behind the new champions Lugano. Basel won 13 of the 26 games and were defeated six times.

In the Swiss Cup Basel started in round 3 with an away match against lower tier Winterthur, which was won 2–1. In round 4 Basel were drawn with an away tie against local rivals and lower tier Concordia Basel, this was won. In round five Basel were matched against Grasshopper Club with another away game. This was drawn and a replay was required, which was held at the Landhof on 22 January 1949, but ended with a defeat and GC advanced to the next round. Servette won the cup as they beat GC 3–0 in the final.

Fifty-seventh season

Düblin was the club's chairman for the fourth successive season. Ernst Hufschmid, who had functioned as player-coach the previous two seasons, continued in this function this season. Basel played a total of 41 games in this season. Of these 26 in the Nationalliga A, five in the Swiss Cup and ten were test games. The test games resulted with three victories and seven defeats. In total, including the test games and the cup competition, they won 21 games, drew five and lost 15 times. In the 41 games they scored 78 goals and conceded 75.

There were fourteen teams contesting in the 1949–50 Nationalliga A, the bottom two teams in the table to be relegated. Basel started the season well, winning six of the first seven games and things continued well. Basel stayed in contention of the championship. But at the end of the season they lost their last two games and finished in second position, two points behind the new champions Servette who won their last two games. Basel won 14 games, drew five and were defeated seven times, they scored 48 goals as they gained their 33 points. Gottlieb Stäuble with 13 goals was the team's best scorer and eighth best league scorer.

Basel started in the third round of the Swiss Cup with an away match against lower tier FC Porrentruy. This was won. In round four Basel were drawn away against Grasshopper Club and this too was won. In the round of 16 and the quarter-final Basel played at home and won against Wil and then against Bellinzona respectively. However Lausanne-Sport won the semi-final and continued to the final and they won the trophy.

Fifty-eighth season

Jules Düblin was the club's chairman for the fifth successive season. Ernst Hufschmid, who had functioned as player-coach the previous three seasons, continued in this function this year. Curiosity, Hufschmid played only in one match this season and it was his last active match as player and this he played as goalkeeper. On 10 August 1950 Football Club Basel played against Eishockey Club Basel. This was a return game for the ice hockey game EHC-FCB in December 1949. The football team won the football match 14–5. Goalkeeper Walter Müller played as striker and he scored six goals. Basel played a total of 40 games in this season. Of these 26 games were in the domestic league, three games were in the Swiss Cup and eleven were test games. The test games resulted with eight victories, one was drawn and two ended with defeats

As in the previous seasons, there were fourteen teams contesting in the 1950–51 Nationalliga A and the bottom two teams in the table to be relegated. Basel played a mediocre season and throughout the season they were in the midfield of the table. At the end of the season Basel won their last two games and finished in fourth position level on points with Zürich and Servette, six points behind the new champions Lausanne-Sport. Basel won 12 games, drew four and were defeated ten times, they scored 62 goals and conceded 51 as they gained their 28 points. Josef "Seppe" Hügi was the team's best scorer and 2nd best league scorer. He netted 21 league goals. In the 3rd principal round of the Swiss Cup on 29 October 1950 in the away match against FC Münchenstein Gottlieb Stäuble had a good day and scored a hat-trick as the team won 6–0 to qualify for the next round. In round 4 Basel were drawn away against Biel-Bienne and this too was won. In round 5 Basel were drawn at home against Locarno. In the 65th minute goalkeeper Walter Müller and defender Werner Wenk were both sent off and Locarno won the game. Locarno later advanced to the final, but here were defeated by La Chaux-de-Fonds who thus won the trophy.

Fifty-ninth season

Jules Düblin was the club's chairman for the sixth successive season. Ernst Hufschmid, who had functioned as player-coach the previous four seasons, continued as team manager this season. Basel played a total of 42 games in this season. Of these 26 games were in the domestic league, five games were in the Swiss Cup and eleven were test games. The test games resulted with four victories, two were drawn and five ended with defeats. In total, including the test games and the cup competition, they won 22 games, drew five and lost 15 times. In the 42 games they scored 123 and conceded 87 goals.

The newly built stadium Landhof was opened on the weekend of 18 and 19 August 1951. There were larger spectator stands, new meeting rooms, changing rooms and a brand new restaurant. The buildings had cost 700,000 Swiss Francs and had taken two years to complete, during this time the team had to play all their games at the Stadion Schützenmatte. The pitch had been newly laid out and its opening was accompanied by a two-day international football tournament, competed by Austrian team First Vienna, French team Sochaux-Montbéliard and Swiss teams Grasshopper Club Zürich. On both days there were over six thousand people celebrating the big party, even though their team lost 2–3 against Vienna and even 1–7 against Sochaux. It was a big hope that these new conditions would also change the fortunes of the club to the better, because nearly 60 years had passed since the club's foundation without a championship. The Basel fans were becoming frustrated, because 36 of the first 52 championships had gone to the cities of Zürich, Geneva or Bern. Even small towns such as Aarau, Neuchâtel, La Chaux-de-Fonds, Lugano, Bellinzona, Biel/Bienne, Winterthur and St. Gallen had been able to celebrate a championship. The championship had still had never been won by a team from Basel.

As in the previous seasons, there were fourteen teams contesting in the 1951–52 Nationalliga A and the bottom two teams in the league table were to be relegated. Basel played a good start to the season. They won the first six games straight off. But they lost four of the next five games and slipped in the league table. However, winning the last three games before and the first three games after the winter break, they were again in contention for the league championship. Suddenly, towards the end of the season, they lost five games in a row and lost contact to the table top. At the end of the season Basel finished in fourth position, seven points behind the new champions Grasshopper Club. The hopeful fans were again frustrated by this fact. The team Basel had won 14 games, drew three games and were defeated nine times. The team scored 68 goals and conceded 47 as they obtained their 31 points. Josef "Seppe" Hügi was team's and the league's best goal scorer with 24 league goals.

Basel started in the 3rd principal round of the Swiss Cup on 4 November 1951 with a home game against lower tier Wettingen and won 7–0. In the next round against Nationalliga A team Locarno they won 3–2 and again in the following round against Nationalliga A team Chiasso by three goals to one. In the quarter finals Basel beat Servette and faced Grasshopper Club in the semi-final. The Grasshoppers won this game in the Landhof and progressed to the final, in which they beat Lugano and thus won the double.

Sixtieth, the first league title

Jules Düblin was the club's chairman for the seventh successive season. At the beginning of the 1952–53 Nationalliga A season, René Bader took over the job as club trainer from Ernst Hufschmid, who had acted as trainer the previous five years. Bader acted as player-manager and Willy Dürr was his assistant; Dürr stood at the side line when Bader played. Basel played a total of 43 games during this season. Of these 26 games were in the domestic league, four games were in the Swiss Cup and 13 were test games. The test games resulted with seven victories, three were drawn and three ended with defeats. In total, including the test games and the cup competition, they won 27 games, drew 11 and lost only five times.

There were fourteen teams contesting in the league. Basel won 17 of the 26 games, losing only once, and they scored 72 goals conceding 38. Basel won the championship four points clear of Young Boys in second position and ten points ahead of Grasshopper Club Zürich who were third. It was Basel's first league title. Josef Hügi was the team's top league goal scorer. He shared the title of the league top scorer with Eugen Meier (Young Boys) both having netted 32 times during the season. In the Swiss Cup Basel started in the 3rd principal round with a 10–0 win against Helvetia Bern and in the 4th round they beat Thun 5–0. In the next round they won 4–1 against Grenchen. All three games were home ties. In the quarter-finals Basel were drawn away against Servette Genève and the tie went into extra time, Basel then losing 3–4.

Sixty-first season

René Bader continued as the team's player-coach, for the second consecutive season. Basel played a total of 41 games during their 1953–54 season. Of these 41 matches 26 were in the domestic league, one match was in the Swiss Cup and 14 were test or friendly matches. The test/friendly games resulted with five victories, one was drawn, but eight matches ended with a defeat. In total, including the test games and the cup competition, 16 games were won, three were drawn and 22 were lost. In their 41 games they scored 93 goals and conceded 111.

There were fourteen teams contesting in the 1953–54 Nationalliga A, the last two teams in the table were to be relegated. Basel won 11 of their 26 games and drew twice, but lost 13 matches. They scored 55 goals and conceded 62. Basel ended the championship with 24 points in 8th position. They were 18 points behind La Chaux-de-Fonds who became Swiss Champions. Josef Hügi was the Basel's top league goal scorer with 30 goals and thus the league top goal scorer. Basel joined the Swiss Cup in the 3rd principal round with a home match in the Landhof against Grenchen. The only goal of the match fell a couple of minutes before the final whistle and Basel were knocked out of the competition in this round.

Sixty-second season

René Bader continued as the team's player-coach, for the third consecutive season with Willy Dürr as his assistant. However, in this season Bader only played in one test match. Basel played a total of 43 games during their 1954–55 season. Of these 43 matches 26 were in the domestic league, three matches were in the Swiss Cup and 14 were test or friendly matches. The test/friendly games resulted with five victories, two were drawn and seven matches ended with a defeat. In total, including the test games and the cup competition, 17 games were won, six were drawn and 20 were lost. In their 41 games they scored 101 goals and conceded 98.

In the league championship, Basel won 10 of their 26 games and drew four times and lost 12 times. They scored 47 goals and conceded 52. Basel ended the championship with 24 points in 9th position. They were 18 points behind La Chaux-de-Fonds who won the Swiss Championship for the second time in a row. Josef Hügi was Basel's top league goal scorer with 20 goals and he was third top goal scorer in the league behind Marcel Mauron from La Chaux-de-Fonds who had scored 30 times. Basel joined the Swiss Cup in the third principal round. They were drawn away against lower tier local team FC Riehen, but the match was played at the Landhof and Basel won 6–0. In the fourth round they were drawn at home to lower tier FC Olten and Basel won 2–0. In the fifth round Basel were drawn at home to Zürich. But here they were knocked out of the competition.

Sixty-third season

During the previous four or five years the number of players joining and leaving the club was increasing considerably. The other Swiss clubs politics of buying new players was increasing strongly and transfer fees rose rapidly in this period. Basel, under the leadership of Jules Düblin, were trying to stay clear of this transfer trading. But because at the beginning of the previous season they had lost important players, such as goalkeeper Gianfranco de Taddeo to Cantonal Neuchatel, midfielder Kurt Maurer to La Chaux-de-Fonds and striker Walter Bielser to Biel-Bienne, the Basel board of directors were changing their approach to the subject. Düblin explained the situation at the AGM and the club members gave him the rights to strengthen the team. Béla Sárosi was hired as new team manager. Various transfers were made, Werner Schley returned from Grasshopper Club, Gottlieb Stäuble returned from Lausanne-Sport, Walter Bielser returned from Biel-Bienne, Silvan Thüler was hired from Solothurn and Peter-Jürgen Sanmann was hired from Concordia Hamburg. The exact amount that this all cost is not recorded, but the club needed to take up credits, one of which came from the city of Basel over the amount of 30,000 Swiss Francs.

As mentioned Béla Sárosi was hired in as new team manager. The Hungarian ex-international footballer had been team manager by Lugano the previous two seasons. He replaced René Bader who continued as player. There were fourteen teams contesting in the 1955–56 Nationalliga A, these were the top 12 teams from the previous season and the two newly promoted teams Urania Genève Sport and FC Schaffhausen. Again this season, the bottom two teams in the table were to be relegated. Basel won 10 of their 26 games and drew six times and lost 10 times. They scored 47 goals and conceded 50. Basel ended the championship with 26 points in 7th position. They were 16 points behind new champions Grasshopper Club.

Basel joined the Swiss Cup in the third principal round. They were drawn away against lower tier local team SC Binningen, but because they waived the home advantage the match was played at the Landhof and Basel won 5–0. Rolf Keller scored a hat-trick in this game. In the fourth round they were drawn at home to lower tier FC Emmenbrücke and Basel won 6–2. Josef Hügi scored a hat-trick in this game. In the fifth round Basel were drawn at home to Biel-Bienne. Gottlieb Stäuble scored a hat-trick and Basel won 7–3. In the quarter-finals basel were drawn away against Cantonal Neuchatel, but here they were knocked out of the competition.

Sixty-fourth season

The Hungarian ex-international footballer Béla Sárosi who had been hired in as new team manager the previous season continued as coach this season. Basel played a total of 41 games this season. Of these 41 matches 26 were in the domestic league, three matches were in the Swiss Cup and 12 were friendly matches. The friendly games resulted with five victories, two were drawn and five friendlies ended with a defeat. In total, including the test games and the cup competition, 21 games were won, seven were drawn and 13 were lost. In their 41 games they scored 78 and conceded 65 goals.

Basel won 15 of their 26 league games and drew four times and lost seven times. They scored 53 goals and conceded 48. Basel ended the championship with 34 points in 4th position. They were 11 points behind the new champions Young Boys. Basel joined the Swiss Cup in the third principal round. They were drawn away against lower tier local team SC Burgdorf and won 1–0. In the fourth round they were drawn away to lower tier Luzern and this ended in a goalless draw after over time. The replay was held at the Landhof but here Basel were knocked out. La Chaux-de-Fonds won the competition.

Sixty-fifth season 

The Austrian ex-international footballer Rudi Strittich was hired as new team manager this season. Basel played a total of 42 games this season. Of these 42 matches 26 were in the domestic league, two were in the Swiss Cup and 14 were friendly matches. The friendly games resulted with seven victories and seven defeats. In total, including the test games and the cup competition, 17 games were won, six games were drawn and 19 games were lost. In their 42 games the team scored 107 goals and conceded 87.

Basel won nine of their 26 league games and drew six times and lost eleven times. They scored 59 goals and conceded 53. Basel ended the championship with 24 points in 9th position. They were 19 points behind Young Boys who were able to defend their championship title. Basel joined the Swiss Cup in the third principal round. They were drawn at home at the Landhof against lower tier local team FC Olten on 2 November 1957. Hans Weber scored five goals during the second half of the game as Basel won 8–0. In the fourth round Basel were also drawn at home against lower tier FC Bern, but here Basel were knocked out. Young Boys won the competition and thus completed the double.

Sixty-sixth season

Jules Düblin was the club's chairman for his 13th successive, but final, period. Düblin presided the club during the period July 1946 until Mai 1959 and in the club's history he is the most permanent president that the club has had to date. The Austrian ex-international footballer Rudi Strittich was team manager for the second successive season. The club directors and the team management strengthened the team following the previous disappointing season. Bruno Michaud returned from Lausanne-Sport, Fredy Kehrli, Jean-Jacques Maurer and Charles Turin were hired from Biel-Bienne who had suffered relegation the previous season. Roberto Frigerio was hired from Schaffhausen and Antoine Kohn from Karlsruher SC. But on 30 November 1958 Basel were beaten 0–2 by FC Moutier, a team from the 1 Liga (third highest tier of Swiss football), and because the Basel had lost their previous three league matches this was one bad result too many. Even for club chairman Jules Düblin, who was known as prudent and cautious, this was too much and he replaced Strittich through their ex-trainer René Bader.

Basel played a total of 50 games this season. Of these 50 matches 26 were in the domestic league, two were in the Swiss Cup and 22 were friendly matches. The friendly games resulted with twelve victories, five draws and five defeats. In total, including the test games and the cup competition, 24 games were won, 10 games were drawn and 16 games were lost. Basel started badly into the new season, losing the first game 1–2 against La Chaux-de-Fonds and then losing at home 1–4 against Grenchen. Then, despite two high wins, 5–0 away against Lausanne-Sport and 6–1 at home against Bellinzona, the afore mentioned three defeats against Young Boys, Zürich and Grasshopper Club caused the change in manager position. But under the new manager things did not change immediately, the lowest point was after round 15 as the team slipped to second last position in the table. But in the last 11 rounds the team lost only one more match and rose in the table to sixth position.

Basel entered the Swiss Cup in the third principal round. They were drawn at home at the Landhof against third tier local team Old Boys. The match was played on 26 October and despite the fact that former Basel goalkeeper Gianfranco de Taddeo, who now played for the Old Boys, held a penalty taken by Hans Weber, Basel won 3–0. In the next round Basel were drawn and lost against FC Moutier. Thus Basel's short and disappointing cup season ended here. As mentioned before, the consequence of this defeat was that team manager Rudi Strittich was fired. Grenchen won the cup this season.

Ernst Weber, chairman 1959–1962

Sixty-seventh season

Ernst Weber was the club's new chairman taking over from Jules Düblin after the AGM on 27 May 1959. Düblin presided the club during the period July 1946 until Mai 1959 and in the club's history he is the most permanent president that the club has had to date. Jenő Vincze was hired as new team manager, following René Bader who had been trainer ad-interim. The Hungarian ex-international footballer Vincze had been team manager of Servette the previous two seasons. Hans Hügi moved on to Young Fellows Zürich after 11 seasons and 220 league and cup games for Basel. Hermann Suter, who had played 16 seasons for Basel and in 229 league and cup games had scored 104 goals, ended his active football career. Antoine Kohn moved on to play for Fortuna '54.

Basel played a total of 44 games this season. Of these 44 matches 26 were in the domestic league, four were in the Swiss Cup and 14 were friendly matches. Basel started badly into the new season, losing five of the first seven games. In fact, the team won only one of their first 16 games and were always in the lower regions of the league table. However, with five victories in their last ten league matches, the team lifted themselves to tenth position in the table. Reigning and new champions were Young Boys who won the championship for the fourth successive season. Basel's top league goal scorers were Roberto Frigerio and Josef Hügi both of whom managed 15 league goals.

Basel entered the Cup in the third principal round. They were drawn away against third tier SC Derendingen and won 1–0 through a goal by their Hungarian striker Ferenc Stockbauer. In the next round Basel were drawn at home at the Landhof against lower tier team FC Porrentruy and this ended with a 5–2 victory. In the round of 16 Basel played a home 1–1 draw with the Young Boys, but then lost the replay 3–5. Luzern won the competition winning the final against Grenchen.

Sixty-eighth season

Ernst Weber was the club's chairman for his second consecutive season and Jenő Vincze was Basel's team manager also for the second season. Basel played a total of 43 games this season. Of these 43 matches 26 were in the domestic league, one was in the Swiss Cup and 16 were friendly matches. Of these test matches five were played as hosts and 11 were played away, 12 were won, two were drawn and two ended with a defeat. The two defeats were suffered at the Landhof against VfR Mannheim and in the St. Jakob Stadium against Santos. The match against Santos was one of the highlights of these test games despite the 2–8 defeat. Gottlieb Stäuble and Josef Hügi scored the goals for Basel. Coutinho scored five and Pelé scored three for Santos. 14,000 spectators paid for a ticket to see the game, much needed money in the bad financial situation that the club was suffering.

Despite a home defeat against Young Fellows in the very first match, Basel started the season well, winning six of their first eight matches. But then came a run with six consecutive defeats in which the team failed to score a single goal. Basel slipped from the table top down to the relegation zone before they managed to return to winning games. Basel ended the season in 5th position with 28 points, but were 18 points behind the new Swiss Champions Servette.

Basel entered the Swiss Cup in the third principal round. They were drawn away against third tier local club Concordia Basel and for Basel the game ended in a fiasco. Despite an early 1–0 lead and in total 18–0 corners, Werner Decker and Heinz Wirz each scored for the under dogs who had a very young Karl Odermatt in their team. Basel lost 2–1 and were eliminated form the competition. Odermatt's football skills were noted, later he and Decker would later transfer to Basel.

Sixty-ninth season

Ernst Weber was the club's chairman for the third consecutive season. The former Czechoslovak footballer Jiří Sobotka was appointed as Basel's new team manager. Basel played a total of 44 games this season. Of these 44 matches 26 were in the domestic league, four were in the Swiss Cup, six were in the newly formed International Football Cup and eight were friendly matches. Of these eight friendly games four were played at home and four away from home. Four games ended in a victory, three were drawn and one ended in a defeat. The friendly match against 1. FC Köln at the end of the season was one of the highlights of these test games, it ended in a 4–4 draw. This was the farewell game for Josef Hügi who was moving on to play for Zürich the following season. René Burri, Roberto Frigerio twice and Hügi himself scored the goals for Basel. Karl-Heinz Thielen, Christian Müller, Breuer and Helmut Benthaus scored the goals for Köln. 14,000 spectators paid their entrance tickets to see the game, much needed money because the club was suffering under a bad financial situation at that time. An interesting point to note was the contact that was made between the club's chairman, Ernst Weber, and the scorer of the final goal of the match, Benthaus. This contact would come in handy a few years later.

Basel were appointed as one of four Swiss representatives in the newly founded International Football Cup. The  1961–62 International Football Cup took place during in the summer break. Basel played in Group B4 together with Sparta Rotterdam, IF Elfsborg and SC Tasmania 1900 Berlin but finished the group in the bottom position.

The team played a mediocre league season, but not much more was expected from the young team, manager Jiří Sobotka was forming the team for the future seasons. Basel finished the season in the mid-field region of the league table in 7th position with 28 points, 12 points behind Servette who won the championship for the second time in a row. Basel won ten games, drew eight and were defeated eight times. Youngster Markus Pfirter was the team's top league goal scorer with nine goals and oldie Josef Hügi scored eight times that season.

Basel entered the Swiss Cup in the third principal round. They were drawn at home against third tier club SR Delémont. Despite being 0–2 in arrear early in the game, they came back to win 3–2. In the fourth round they faced fourth tier local club FC Breite, with ex-FCB player Hans Hügi (who had retired from active football) in another home game. Older brother Hügi (I) defended against younger brother Hügi (II), but younger brother won the duel and scored two of the goals as Basel won 3–0 to continue to the next round. In the fifth round Basel won due to an own goal against Zürich, but in the quarter-final they were defeated by Bellinzona, who continued to the final, but here they were defeated by cup winners Lausanne-Sport after extra time.

Cup win number three

Seventieth season

Lucien Schmidlin was voted as new club chairman at the AGM to follow Ernst Weber, who had announced his retirement from the position. The Czechoslovakian manager Jiří Sobotka was the club manager at this time and it was his second season as head-coach. One of the biggest transfers made during this time was the transfer of the 19 year old Karl Odermatt from Concordia Basel. Odermatt joined in a swop, Hansueli Oberer and Silvan Thüler went to Concordia. Not only these two players left the squad, but also Paul Speidel moved on to Cantonal Neuchatel and Josef Hügi (Hugi II) was nearly at the end of his football career. "Seppe" Hugi had played 363 competition games for the club and in these had scored 272 goals, he moved on to play for Zürich.

Basel were appointed as one of four Swiss representatives in the International Football Cup (IFC). The 1962–63 IFC took place during in the summer break. Basel played in Group B3 together with PSV Eindhoven, HNK Rijeka and Rot-Weiss Oberhausen. Basel ended the group stage in third position, winners of the group were HNK Rijeka who thus advanced to the quarter-finals. Basel played a total of 51 games this season. Of these 51, 26 were in the domestic league, six were in the Swiss Cup, three in the Cup of the Alps, six in the International Football Cup (IFC) and ten were friendly matches. Of these friendly games, five were won, three drawn and two ended in a defeat. Basel finished the championship in sixth position with twenty six points, with ten wins and six draws from 26 matches, scoring 59 goals conceding 51. FC Zürich won the championship. Heinz Blumer was Basel's top scorer this season with 16 goals, Karl Odermatt their second best goal scorer with 14.

In the Swiss Cup Basel started in the 3rd principal round, on 3 November, with a 4–0 home win, in the St. Jakob Stadium against Black Stars. In the 4th round, on 2 December, they played away against Young Boys winning 2–0. In the next round, on 30 December they won 7–1 at home against SC Burgdorf. In the quarter-finals, played on 24 February 1963, Basel were drawn away against Chiasso and Basel achieved a 2–1 victory. The semi-final was played on 24 March in the St. Jakob Stadium. Basel beat Lausanne-Sports 1–0 the winning goal scored by Markus Pfirter. The Wankdorf Stadium hosted the Swiss Cup Final on 15 April and Basel played against favorites Grasshopper Club Zürich. Two goals after half time, one by Heinz Blumer and the second from Otto Ludwig gave Basel a 2–0 victory and their third Cup win in their history. Peter Füri played in all games except in the final due to an illness.

Seventy-first season

Lucien Schmidlin was club chairman for the second year running. Jiří Sobotka continued his job as club manager, it was his third consecutive year as manager. Basel played a total of 55 games this season. Of these 26 were in the domestic league, three were in the Swiss Cup, two in the 1963–64 European Cup Winners' Cup, three in the Cup of the Alps and 21 were friendly matches. Of these 21 test games 12 were won, five drawn and four were lost. A well-documented curiosity was the fact that during the winter break of the 1963–64 season the team travelled on a world tour. This saw them visit British Hong Kong, Malaysia, Singapore, Australia, New Zealand, French Polynesia, Mexico and the United States. First team manager Jiří Sobotka together with 16 players and 15 members of staff, supporters and journalists participated in this world tour from 10 January to 10 February 1964. Team captain Bruno Michaud filmed the events with his super-8 camara.

Basel started well into the league season, winning four of the first five matches. Despite three away defeats, up until the winter break the team were championship leaders with seven wins and three draws. The second half of the season, following the world tour, started with three straight defeats. Basel consequently slipped down in the league table and finished the championship in seventh position, with ten wins and six draws from 26 matches, scoring 42 goals conceding 48, with twenty six points, 13 points less than the new champions La Chaux-de-Fonds.

As title holders in the Swiss Cup, Basel started in the 3rd principal round, on 5 October 1963, with an easy away win against SC Schöftland in their attempt to defend this title. In the round of 32 they played away from home against local rivals Concordia which was also won with ease. In the round of 16 Basel were drawn against lower classed Porrentruy. However, this was indeed the best period in the Porrentruy club history. Their player-manager at that time was Basel's former striker Hügi (II) and game ended with a surprising 0–1 defeat, goal scorer in the 56 minute was another former Basel player René Jaeck. Basel's cup campaign came to an abrupt and disappointing end.

As Swiss Cup holders Basel were qualified for the 1963–64 European Cup Winners' Cup competition. Here they were drawn against the Scottish cup holders Celtic. Both games ended very disappointingly (1–5 and 0–5) and thus ended with a disastrous aggregate result.

Seventy-second season

Lucien Schmidlin was club chairman for the third consecutive year. The Czechoslovakian manager Jiří Sobotka was the Basel team manager and it was his fourth season as manager. Basel played a total of 51 matches un this season. 26 of these were in the domestic league, five were in the Swiss Cup, four matches were in the Inter-Cities Fairs Cup and 16 were friendly matches. Of these 16 test games eight were won, four drawn and four were lost. A sad moment to be noted is, on 26 December 1964 FCB played against Grasshoppers Zürich in the quarter-finals of the Swiss Cup. They decided the match 3–1 for themselves in overtime, Hans Weber had scored the equaliser two minutes before the end of the regular time. This was to be the very last match for the popular Basler captain of that time, because just seven weeks later he died of cancer. Between his first appearance in 1949 and his death in February 1965 he made 380 appearances for Basel scoring 68 goals. 245 of these games were in the Nationalliga A, 27 in the Swiss Cup, 8 were European Cup matches and 99 were friendly games. He scored 33 goals in the domestic league, 13 in the Swiss Cup, 2 in the Cup of the Alps and the other 20 were scored during the test games.

Fourteen teams contested the 1964–65 Nationalliga A. Basel ended the championship with eleven wins and five draws in their 26 matches, and finished in eighth position with 27 points. They scored 44 goals and conceded 54. For Basel it was a mediocre season with some very unusual and high scoring results, 5–4 at home against Grasshopper Club, 4–3 at home against Biel-Bienne and a 3–3 draw at home against the new champions Lausanne-Sport after a three goal lead before half time. There were also some high scoring defeats, 1–5 away against Grenchen, 0–6 away against Sion, 0–6 away against La Chaux-de-Fonds and a 1–6 away in the last game of the season against Young Boys. Roberto Frigerio was the team's top goal scorer with 13 goals. Lausanne Sports won the championship with 36 points.

In the Swiss Cup Basel started in the round of 64, 10 October 1964, with a home win against lower classed Locarno. In the next round they played at home against Bern which was won 3–1 and, consequently, drawn at home against Lasuanne Sports in the round of 16 which ended in a 3–2 victory. After the quarter-final against Grasshoppers Zürich (mentioned above) Basel were drawn at home again for the semi-final. This game was against Sion and was played on 7 March 1965. Basel were defeated 2–3 and Sion continued to the final which they won against Servette.

Basel were qualified for the 1964–65 Inter-Cities Fairs Cup and in the first round they played CA Spora Luxembourg. A 2–0 home win and a 0–1 away defeat was enough to take them through to the second round. But two defeats against Strasbourg ended their Fairs Cup competition.

See also
FC Basel
List of FC Basel players
List of FC Basel seasons
Football in Switzerland

References

Sources
 Die ersten 125 Jahre / 2018. Publisher: Josef Zindel im Friedrich Reinhardt Verlag, Basel. 
 FC Basel Archiv / Verein "Basler Fussballarchiv”

External links
 Official Website
 Rotblau.ch Statistik Website
 FC Basel Fan club website
 http://www.football.ch

FC Basel
Basel